Kirjathaim - two cities; a double city. 

Kirjathaim may refer to:
A city of refuge in Naphtali. 
A town on the east of Jordan. It was assigned to the tribe of Reuben. In the time of  it was one of the four cities which formed the "glory of Moab" (Compare ). It has been identified with el-Kureiyat, 11 miles south-west of Medeba, on the south slope of Jebel Attarus, the ancient Ataroth.

References

Hebrew Bible cities
Tribe of Reuben